Unión América was a Peruvian football club, playing in the city of Lima, Peru.

History
The club Unión América was founded on Lima. The club was the 1965 Segunda Division Peruana champion.

Unión América participated in the 1959 Peruvian Primera División, but was relegated the same year.

Honours

National
Peruvian Segunda División: 1
Winners (1): 1958
Runner-up (1): 1956

See also
List of football clubs in Peru
Peruvian football league system

External links
 Peru 2nd Division Champions (Lima)
 Peruvian First Division

Football clubs in Peru